This list comprises all players who have been placed on a regular-season roster for NJ/NY Gotham FC (formerly Sky Blue FC) since the team's first Women's Professional Soccer season in 2009.  This list does not include pre-season training rosters, short term players, or discovery players who do not appear for the club.

All-time statistics

Regular season statistics

Playoff statistics

Key to positions

External links
 Sky Blue FC 2009 regular season statistics
 Sky Blue FC 2009 playoff statistics

Players
Sky Blue FC players
Association football player non-biographical articles
Sky Blue FC roster